Joseph Malaby Dent (30 August 1849 – 9 May 1926) was a British book publisher who produced the Everyman's Library series.

Early life
Dent was born in Darlington in what is now part of the Grade II listed Britannia Inn. After a short and unsuccessful stint as an apprentice printer he took up bookbinding. At the age of fifteen he gave a talk on James Boswell's Life of Johnson which would be the first book printed in the Everyman's Library. Around 1896 he began publishing high-quality limited editions of literary classics in the Temple Classics series.

Career
In 1888 he founded the publishing firm of J. M. Dent and Company (it became J.M. Dent & Sons in 1909). Between 1889 and 1894 Dent published the works of Charles Lamb, Oliver Goldsmith, Jane Austen, Chaucer, Tennyson, and like authors. Printed in small runs on handmade paper, these early editions enjoyed modest commercial success. Dent established the highly successful Temple Shakespeare series in 1894.

In 1904, Dent began to plan Everyman's Library, a series of one thousand classics to be published in an attractive format and sold at one shilling. To meet demand, Dent built the Temple Press in Letchworth recently founded as the first Garden City. The publication of the Everyman Library began in 1906 and 152 titles were issued by the end of the first year. However, it was soon confronted by a double blow: the Copyright Act 1911 which extended protection to fifty years after the author's death thus reducing the availability of Victorian texts, and World War I which brought with it inflation and shortages of supplies.

In A Sinking Island, Hugh Kenner wrote:  "Destiny beckoned J. M. Dent toward the kingdom of books, and without ever learning to spell he became an influential bookman.  He was small, lame, tight-fisted, and apt to weep under pressure, a performance that could disconcert authors and employees.  When his temper had risen like a flame he'd scream; the scream, one employee recalled, was what broke men's spirits.  His paroxysms were famous; a Swedish specialist thought of prescribing a pail of cold water for Dent to plunge his head into.  For editing the Library he paid Ernest Rhys three guineas a volume—what senior office-boys might earn in two weeks.  Dent's ungovernable passion was for bringing Books to the People.  He remembered when he'd longed to buy books he couldn't afford.  Yes, you could make the world better.  He even thought cheap books might prevent wars."

Although not a new idea, what set Everyman's apart from earlier series was its scope; Dent planned for no less than one thousand volumes.  He was able to build a new factory and offices in Covent Garden with the profits.  Despite having an impressive range of literature, Dent prevented classics of dubious morals, such as Moll Flanders, from being printed.  The First World War slowed the production of books and Dent did not live to see the one thousand volume mark reached in 1956.

Among the impressive volumes that came from Dent was The Pilgrim's Regress, the spiritual autobiography of C. S. Lewis, published in 1933.

Later years
J. M. Dent, his sons Hugh and Jack, and Jack's son F. J. Martin Dent, constituted the board of directors in the 1920s.  Hugh Dent joined the firm in 1909 and functioned as an editor for Everyman's Library; Jack joined the firm in 1915 and supervised the Temple Press; F. J. Martin Dent came in 1924 and directed the production department. After J. M. Dent's death, W. G. Taylor, the secretary of the firm since 1916, joined the board. Hugh R. Dent served as the chairman from 1926 to 1938, followed by Taylor from 1938 to 1963. Taylor was also managing director from 1934 to 1955. F. J. Martin Dent followed Taylor as managing director and chairman. Weidenfeld & Nicolson purchased J. M. Dent & Sons in January 1988. It now forms an imprint of the Orion Publishing Group. The registered companies of J. M. Dent & Sons and Everyman's Library were retained by the Dent family and are now, respectively, an investment company, Malaby Holdings Ltd, and Malaby Martin Ltd, a niche development company. A new sister company Malaby Biogas Ltd was created in 2009 as a pioneering renewable energy and sustainable development business.

References

Further reading
 J. M. and Hugh R. Dent, The House of Dent 1888-1938: being the memoirs of J.M. Dent with additional chapters covering the last 16 years by Hugh R Dent, London: J. M. Dent, 1938.
 Ernest Rhys, Everyman Remembers, London: J. M. Dent and Sons Limited, 1931; New York: Cosmopolitan Book Corporation, 1931.

External links

Works published by Dent, at Internet Archive
J.M. Dent & Sons Records, 1834-1986, unc.edu. "Archival material held in the Wilson Library at the University of North Carolina at Chapel Hill".

1849 births
1926 deaths
British book publishers (people)
Book publishing companies of the United Kingdom
People from Darlington